Charity is a c. 1611 oil on canvas painting by Guido Reni, now in the Galleria Palatina in Florence. It passed into the main Medici collections from that of cardinal Leopoldo de' Medici on his death in 1675. It appears at the top left of Johann Zoffany's Tribuna of the Uffizi (1772-1778).

References

1611 paintings
17th-century allegorical paintings
Allegorical paintings by Italian artists
Paintings by Guido Reni
Paintings in the collection of the Galleria Palatina